The 2013–14 Prva A liga season was another season of the Montenegrin Basketball League. Budućnost Podgorica won their 7th national championship.

Regular season
Superliga

Playoffs

Prva A liga seasons
Montenegro
Prva A liga